Woodland Heights is a census-designated place (CDP) in Venango County, Pennsylvania, United States. The population was 1,402 at the 2000 census.

Geography
Woodland Heights is located at  (41.409363, -79.701591).

Demographics

As of the census of 2000, there were 1,402 people, 588 households, and 402 families residing in the CDP. The population density was 848.4 people per square mile (328.1/km2). There were 612 housing units at an average density of 370.4/sq mi (143.2/km2). The racial makeup of the CDP was 97.57% White, 0.43% African American, 0.36% Native American, 0.43% Asian, 0.57% from other races, and 0.64% from two or more races. Hispanic or Latino of any race were 1.85% of the population.

There were 588 households. Out of these households, 33.0% had children under the age of 18 living with them, 48.8% were married couples living together, 16.0% had a female householder with no husband present, and 31.6% were non-families. 27.6% of all households were made up of individuals, and 12.4% had someone living alone who was 65 years of age or older. The average household size had 2.38 people and the average family size had 2.87 people.

In the CDP, the population was spread out, with 26.5% under the age of 18, 9.9% from 18 to 24, 25.0% from 25 to 44, 23.3% from 45 to 64, and 15.3% who were 65 years of age or older. The median age was 37 years. For every 100 females, there were 82.3 males. For every 100 females age 18 and over, there were 77.5 males.

The median income for a household in the CDP was $31,875, and the median income for a family was $36,696. Males had a median income of $30,074 versus $27,109 for females. The per capita income for the CDP was $15,123. About 16.1% of families and 17.8% of the population were below the poverty line, including 18.2% of those under age 18 and 3.4% of those age 65 or over.

References

 

Census-designated places in Venango County, Pennsylvania
Census-designated places in Pennsylvania